The 2015–16 La Salle Explorers basketball team represented La Salle University during the 2015–16 NCAA Division I men's basketball season. The Explorers, led by 12th year head coach John Giannini, played their home games at Tom Gola Arena and were members of the Atlantic 10 Conference. They finished the season 9–22, 4–14 in A-10 play to finish in last place. They defeated Duquesne in the first round of the A-10 tournament to advance to the second round where they lost to Davidson.

Previous season 
The Explorers finished the season 17–16, 8–10 in A-10 play to finish in ninth place. They advanced to the quarterfinals of the A-10 tournament where they lost to Davidson.

Departures

Incoming Transfers

 Under NCAA transfer rules, Henry, Johnson and Powell will have to sit out for the 2015–16 season. Henry and Johnson will have two years of remaining eligibility entering the 2016–17 season, and Powell will have three.

Recruiting

Roster

Schedule

|-
!colspan=9 style="background:#; color:#;"| Exhibition

|-
!colspan=9 style="background:#; color:#;"| Non-conference regular season

|-
!colspan=9 style="background:#;"|Atlantic 10 regular season

|-
!colspan=9 style="background:#;"|Atlantic 10 tournament

See also
 2015–16 La Salle Explorers women's basketball team

References

La Salle Explorers men's basketball seasons
La Salle
La Salle Explorers men's basketball
La Salle Explorers men's basketball